Shaun McKernan (born 1 September 1990) is a former Australian rules footballer having played for the St Kilda Football Club, Essendon Football Club and the Adelaide Football Club in the Australian Football League (AFL).

AFL career

Adelaide
McKernan showed glimpses of his potential but soft tissue injuries and untimely suspensions meant he failed to cement a regular AFL spot. After six seasons and 34 games with the club, Adelaide delisted him.

Essendon
He joined  with pick 12 in the 2014 rookie draft. In November 2016, McKernan was delisted by Essendon, however, he was re-drafted by Essendon in the 2017 rookie draft. McKernan was mainly used as a forward target with the occasional role of relieving in the ruck. McKernan played 16 games in 2019, of which nine were victories and was selected in the Bombers' Elimination Final team. In that season he also kicked 4 goals twice; against Melbourne in round three and Gold Coast in round 19. In a Covid-interrupted season, McKernan played nine of a possible 17 games for the Bombers for four wins, four losses and a draw. Of his final season at Essendon in 2020, McKernan admitted that he had 'fallen out love with the game' and that he "wasn’t happy with how my time finished at Essendon." McKernan wasn't interviewed as part of Essendon's football review at the end of 2020, of which he stated "for [Essendon] is probably a good thing because I would have been pretty honest." Essendon ultimately delisted McKernan and five others on 20 September 2020.

St Kilda
On 6 November 2020, McKernan joined St Kilda as a Free Agent. McKernan was courted by a number of clubs including Melbourne, but ultimately signed for the Saints. McKernan preferenced the Saints due to their closer proximity to his home, compared with Melbourne's training base at Casey Fields. McKernan was brought in primarily as injury coverage for the Saints' forwards.

With 1 round remaining in the 2021 season McKernan announced his retirement after not being offered a contract for 2022.

Family
He is the younger brother of North Melbourne premiership ruckman and Leigh Matthews Trophy winner Corey McKernan.

Statistics
Statistics are correct to the end of 2020.

|-
| scope="row" | 2009 ||  || 35
| 1 || — || 1 || 4 || 4|| 8 || 2 || 3 || — || — || 1.0 || 4.0 || 4.0 || 8.0|| 2.0 || 3.0 || 0.0
|- style="background-color: #EAEAEA"
| scope="row" | 2010 ||  || 35
| 0 || — || — || — || — || — || — || — || — || — || — || — || — || — || — || — || -
|-
| scope="row" | 2011 ||  || 35
| 16 || 10 || 8 || 98 || 38 || 136 || 60 || 24 || 92 ||0.6|| 0.5||6.1 ||2.4 ||8.5 ||3.7 ||1.5 ||5.7
|- style="background-color: #EAEAEA"
| scope="row" | 2012 ||  || 35
| 6 || 3 || 4 || 28 || 22 || 50 || 9 || 4 || 85 || 0.5 ||0.7 || 4.7 || 3.6 ||8.3 || 1.5 || 0.7 || 14.2
|-
| scope="row" | 2013 ||  || 35
| 9 || 7 || 10 || 62 || 44|| 106 || 35 || 22 || 73 || 0.8 || 1.1 || 6.9 || 4.9 || 11.8 || 3.9 || 2.4 || 8.1

|- style="background-color: #EAEAEA"
| scope="row" | 2014 ||  || 35
| 2 || 1 || 1 || 10 || 11 || 21 || 3 || 3 || 10 || 0.5 || 0.5 || 5.0 || 5.5 || 10.5 || 1.5 || 1.5 ||6.0
|-
| scope="row" | 2015 ||  || 44
| 9 || 6 || 3 || 86 || 79 || 165 || 34 || 14 || 206 || 0.7 || 0.3 || 9.6 || 8.8 || 18.5 || 3.8 || 1.6 ||22.9
|- style="background-color: #EAEAEA"
| scope="row" | 2016 ||  || 44
| 6 || 4 || 1 || 44 || 21 || 65|| 20 || 8 || 41 || 07 || 0.2 || 7.3|| 3.5 || 10.8 || 3.3 || 1.3 ||6.8
|-
| scope="row" | 2017 ||  || 44
| 3 || 3 ||- || 18 || 19 || 37 || 12 || 3 || 51 || 1.0 || 0.0 || 6.0 || 6.3 || 12.3 || 4.0 || 2.3 || 17.0 
|- style="background-color: #EAEAEA"
| scope="row" | 2018 ||  || 44
| 10 || 16 || 11|| 95 || 38 || 133 || 56 || 21 || 81 || 1.6 || 1.1 ||9.5 || 3.8 || 13.3 || 5.6 || 2.1 ||8.1
|-
| scope="row" | 2019 ||  || 44
| 16 || 17 || 11 || 136 || 58 || 194 || 81 || 30 || 116 || 1.1 || 0.7 || 8.5|| 3.6 || 12.1 || 5.1 || 1.9 ||7.3
|- style="background-color: #EAEAEA"
| scope="row" | 2020 ||  || 44
| 9 || 5 || 6 || 48 || 24 || 72 || 31 || 11 ||41 || 0.6 || 0.7 || 5.3 || 2.7 || 8.0 || 3.4 || 1.2 || 4.6 
|- class="sortbottom"
! colspan=3| Career
! 87 !! 72 !! 56 !! 629 !! 358 !! 987 !! 343 !! 147 !! 798 !! 0.8 !! 0.6 !! 7.2 !! 4.1 !! 11.3 !! 3.9 !! 1.7 !!9.2
|}

References

External links

1990 births
Living people
Australian rules footballers from Victoria (Australia)
Adelaide Football Club players
Calder Cannons players
Adelaide Football Club (SANFL) players
Essendon Football Club players
St Kilda Football Club players
Sandringham Football Club players